The Northrop T-38 Talon is a two-seat, twinjet supersonic jet trainer. It was the world's first, and the most produced, supersonic trainer. The T-38 remains in service  in several air forces.

The United States Air Force (USAF) operates the most T-38s. In addition to training USAF pilots, the T-38 is used by NASA. The U.S. Naval Test Pilot School in Patuxent River, Maryland, is the principal US Navy operator (other T-38s were previously used as USN for dissimilar air combat training until replaced by the similar Northrop F-5 Tiger II). Pilots of other NATO nations fly the T-38 in joint training programs with USAF pilots.

, the T-38 has been in service for over 60 years with its original operator, the United States Air Force.

In September 2018, USAF announced the replacement of the Talon by the Boeing-Saab T-7 Red Hawk with phaseout to begin in 2023.

Design and development

In 1952, Northrop began work on a fighter project, the N-102 Fang, with shoulder-mounted delta wing and a single engine. The proposed General Electric J79 engine, weighing nearly two tons, meant the resulting aircraft would be large and expensive. Then in 1953, representatives from General Electric Aviation's newly created Small Aircraft Engine Department showed Northrop a relatively tiny engine (around 400 lb installed weight) capable of 2,500 lb of thrust and Northrop VP-Engineering Edgar Schmued saw the possibility of reversing the trend toward the large fighters. Schmued and chief engineer Welko Gasich decided on a small, twin-engined "hot-rod" fighter, the N-156. Northrop began its N-156 project in 1954, aiming for a small, supersonic fighter jet capable of operating from the US Navy's escort carriers. When the Navy chose not to pursue equipping its fleets in that fashion, though, Northrop continued the N-156 design using in-house funding, recasting it as a lightweight fighter (dubbed N-156F) and aimed at the export market.

In the mid-1950s, the USAF issued a general operating requirement for a supersonic trainer, planning to retire its 1940s-era Lockheed T-33s. Northrop officials decided to adapt the N-156 to this competition. The only other candidate was the two-seat version of the North American F-100 Super Sabre. Although the F-100 was not considered the ideal candidate for a training aircraft (it is not capable of recovering from a spin), NAA was still considered the favorite in the competition due to that company's favored-contractor status with the USAF, but Northrop officials convincingly presented lifecycle cost comparisons that could not be ignored, and they were awarded the contract, receiving an order for three prototypes. The first (designated YT-38) flew on 10 April 1959. The type was quickly adopted and the first production examples were delivered in 1961, officially entering service on 17 March that year, complementing the T-37 primary jet trainer. When production ended in 1972, 1,187 T-38s had been built (plus two N-156T prototypes). Since its introduction, an estimated 50,000 military pilots have trained on this aircraft. The USAF remains one of the few armed flying forces using dedicated supersonic final trainers, as most, such as the US Navy, use high-subsonic trainers.

The T-38 is of conventional configuration, with a small, low, long-chord wing, a single vertical stabilizer, and tricycle undercarriage. The aircraft seats a student pilot and instructor in tandem, and has intakes for its two turbojet engines at the wing roots. Its nimble performance has earned it the nickname "white rocket". In 1962, the T-38 set absolute time-to-climb records for 3,000, 6,000, 9,000, and 12,000 meters, beating the records for those altitudes set by the F-104 in December 1958. (The F-4 Phantom beat the T-38's records less than a month later.)

The F-5B and F (which also derive from the N-156) can be distinguished from the T-38 by the wings; the wing of the T-38 meets the fuselage straight and ends square, while the F-5 has leading edge extensions near the wing roots and wingtip launch rails for air-to-air missiles. The wings of both the T-38 and the F-5 family use conventional skin over spar-rib structure.

Most T-38s built were of the T-38A variant, but the USAF also had a small number of aircraft converted for weapons training (designated AT-38B), which were fitted with a gunsight and could carry a gun pod, rockets, or bombs on a centerline pylon. As of September 30, 2017, 503 T-38s were still operational with the USAF, with many more in operation around the world. Most of the USAF-variant aircraft (T-38A and AT-38B) have been converted to the T-38C through an avionics upgrade program. Improvements include the addition of a head-up display, global satellite positioning, inertial navigation system, and traffic collision avoidance system. Most jets have also received a propulsion modification to improve low-altitude engine thrust. Around a third of the fleet (those that experience more severe usage) are currently undergoing structural replacements and upgrades, as well as receiving new wings, to extend their service life to 2029.

The fighter version of the N-156 was eventually selected for the US Military Assistance Program and produced as the F-5 Freedom Fighter. Many of these have since reverted to a weapons-training role, as various air forces have introduced newer types into service. The F-5G was an advanced single-engined variant later renamed the F-20 Tigershark. In 2018, the Iranian Air Force announced that an outwardly similar aircraft, named the Kowsar, had been constructed within Iran.

Operational history

Military
The USAF Strategic Air Command (SAC) had T-38s in service from 1978 until SAC's 1991 inactivation. These aircraft were used to enhance the career development of bomber and tanker copilots through the Accelerated Copilot Enrichment Program. They were later used as proficiency aircraft for all B-52, B-1, Lockheed SR-71, U-2, Boeing KC-135, and KC-10 pilots. SAC's successors, the Air Combat Command (ACC) and the Air Force Global Strike Command (AFGSC) continue to retain T-38s as proficiency aircraft for U-2 pilots and B-2 pilots, respectively.

The Air Training Command's  successor, the Air Education and Training Command (AETC), uses the T-38C to prepare pilots for the F-15C Eagle and F-15E Strike Eagle, the F-16 Fighting Falcon, B-52 Stratofortress, B-1B Lancer, B-2 Spirit, A-10 Thunderbolt, F-22 Raptor, and F-35 Lightning II. The AETC received T-38Cs in 2001 as part of the Avionics Upgrade Program. The T-38Cs owned by the AETC have undergone propulsion modernization, which replaces major engine components to enhance reliability and maintainability, and an engine inlet/injector modification to increase available takeoff thrust. These upgrades and modifications, with the Pacer Classic program, were to extend the service life of T-38s past 2020. The T-38 has an availability goal of 75%, which it maintained in 2011, but in 2015 its availability was 60%.

Besides the USAF, USN, and NASA, other T-38 operators included the German Air Force, the Portuguese Air Force, the Republic of China Air Force, and the Turkish Air Force.

Replacement
The USAF launched the T-X program in 2010 to replace the T-38. Bidders included a joint venture of BAE Systems and Rolls-Royce, offering the Hawk trainer, equipped with Rolls' Adour Mk951 engine with FADEC; Lockheed Martin and Korea Aerospace Industries, offering the T-50; and Raytheon and Alenia Aermacchi offering the T-100, an aircraft whose design originated with the M-346. Boeing and Saab offered a new-technology design powered by the General Electric F404 turbofan engine. The Boeing/Saab bid first flew on December 20, 2016, and on September 27, 2018, was declared the winner of the T-X competition.

NASA
NASA operates a fleet of 32 T-38 aircraft and uses the aircraft as a jet trainer for its astronauts, and as a chase plane. Its fleet is housed primarily at Ellington Field in Houston, Texas. NASA's internal projections showed the number of operational jet trainers falling to 16 by 2015. The agency spends $25–30 million annually to fly and maintain the T-38s.

During the Space Shuttle era, an established NASA tradition was for astronauts to arrive at the Kennedy Space Center in T-38 Talons.

Civil
Seven privately owned T-38s are in the U.S. Boeing owns two T-38s, which are used as chase planes. Thornton Corporation owns two T-38s, and the National Test Pilot School owns one T-38. In addition, two others are in private ownership.

Variants

 N-156T: Northrop company designation.
 YT-38: Prototypes, two built with YJ85-GE-1 engines, later designated YT-38A and four pre-production aircraft with YJ-85-GE-5 engines, later designated T-38A.
 T-38A: Two-seat advanced training aircraft, production model, 1,139 built.
 T-38A(N): Two-seat astronaut training version for NASA.  See T-38N below.
 AT-38A: A small number of T-38As were converted into weapons training aircraft.
 DT-38A: A number of US Navy T-38As were converted into drone directors.
 GT-38A: Permanently grounded aircraft, often due to flight or ground mishap, converted into ground procedural trainers or aircraft maintenance trainers.
 NT-38A: A small number of T-38As were converted into research and test aircraft.
 QT-38A: Unmanned target drone aircraft.
 AT-38B: Two-seat weapons training aircraft.
 T-38C: A T-38A with structural and avionics upgrades.
 T-38M: Modernized Turkish Air Force T-38As with full glass cockpit and avionics, upgraded by Turkish Aerospace Industries under the project codename "ARI" (for Bee).
 T-38N: Former USAF T-38As bailed to NASA and T-38As directly assigned to NASA that received an Avionics Upgrade Program (AUP), modernizing communications and navigation systems, replacing outdated avionics, and adding a weather radar, flight management system, altitude alert systems, and modern controls and displays.
 T-38 VTOL Proposed vertical takeoff variant with four lift nozzles behind the pilot.

Operators

Current 

German Air Force - 46 T-38A in 1968, now upgraded to T-38C. All aircraft are stationed at Sheppard AFB, Texas and are painted in US markings.

Turkish Air Force - 33 T-38M in service.

United States Air Force - 497 T-38 trainers in service .
1st Fighter Wing – Langley AFB, Virginia

71st Fighter Training Squadron

9th Reconnaissance Wing – Beale Air Force Base, California

1st Reconnaissance Squadron

12th Flying Training Wing – Randolph Air Force Base, Texas

435th Fighter Training Squadron

560th Flying Training Squadron

14th Flying Training Wing – Columbus Air Force Base, Mississippi

49th Fighter Training Squadron

50th Flying Training Squadron

47th Flying Training Wing – Laughlin Air Force Base, Texas

87th Flying Training Squadron

71st Flying Training Wing – Vance Air Force Base, Oklahoma

25th Flying Training Squadron

80th Flying Training Wing – Sheppard Air Force Base, Texas

88th Fighter Training Squadron

90th Flying Training Squadron

469th Flying Training Squadron

96th Test Group – Holloman Air Force Base, New Mexico

586th Flight Test Squadron

325th Fighter Wing – Tyndall Air Force Base, Florida

2d Fighter Training Squadron

340th Flying Training Group – Randolph Air Force Base, Texas

43d Flying Training Squadron (Columbus AFB)

96th Flying Training Squadron (Laughlin AFB)

97th Flying Training Squadron (Sheppard AFB)

412th Test Wing – Edwards Air Force Base, California

445th Flight Test Squadron

413th Flight Test Group – Randolph Air Force Base, Texas

415th Flight Test Flight

509th Bomb Wing – Whiteman Air Force Base, Missouri

13th Bomb Squadron

United States Navy - 9 aircraft in use .
United States Naval Test Pilot School
NASA - approximately 32 aircraft transferred from USAF

Former 

 Portuguese Air Force - 12 aircraft in 1977. Initially operated by 201 Sqn. "Falcões" (Falcons) at Air Base No. 5, in 1980 they were transferred to 103 Sqn. "Caracóis" (Snails) being stationed in Air Base No. 11. They were retired in 1993 replaced by Dassault/Dornier Alpha Jet

Republic of Korea Air Force - 30 T-38A from the US in April 1999. All units were returned to the US by 2009 after near completion of production of T-50 Golden Eagle supersonic trainer.

Republic of China Air Force - former operator, all aircraft returned to the US in 1998.

Accidents and incidents
More than 210 aircraft losses and ejections have been documented over the lifetime of the T-38. The USAF has recorded 149 fatalities since operations began in 1960.

 February 1962 - The first crash of a T-38 occurred, near Webb AFB, Texas. One pilot was killed.
 31 October 1964 - Astronaut Theodore Freeman was killed as a result of a bird strike on a NASA operated T-38.
 28 February 1966 (1966 NASA T-38 crash) - Astronauts Elliot See and Charles Bassett were killed when they struck a building in fog.
 5 October 1967 - Astronaut Clifton "C.C." Williams was killed in a crash of a NASA operated T-38 due to an aileron jam.
 18 January 1982 - Diamond Crash - Four T-38As of the U.S. Air Force Thunderbirds crashed while practicing for an airshow. After this crash, the T-38 was replaced in this role by the front line F-16A Fighting Falcon.
 21 May 2009 - One pilot was killed and the other ejected with serious injuries after a rudder malfunction caused the crash of a USAF T38A.
 21 November 2019 - Two pilots killed during a collision while landing.
 19 February 2021 - The two-person USAF crew of a T-38 was killed in a landing crash near Montgomery Regional Airport in Alabama. The aircraft was assigned to the USAF 14th Flying Training Wing at Columbus AFB, Mississippi. The crash was later attributed to pilot error.
 19 November 2021 - Two aircraft collided on approach to Laughlin Air Force base, resulting in the death of one student.
 7 November 2022 - A T-38C crashed near Columbus AFB, Mississippi, with one pilot safely ejecting.

Aircraft on display

YT-38A
58-1192 – South Dakota Air and Space Museum at Ellsworth AFB, South Dakota.

T-38A
58-1196 – California Science Center, in Los Angeles, California
59-1600 – Phoenix–Mesa Gateway Airport
59-1601 – On base display, Air University area, Maxwell AFB, Alabama
59-1602 – On base display, United States Air Force Academy, in Colorado Springs, Colorado.  Painted as "Thunderbird 1"
59-1604 – National Naval Aviation Museum, NAS Pensacola, Florida; former USAF aircraft bailed to USN and utilized by the U.S. Naval Test Pilot School at NAS Patuxent River, Maryland.
59-1605 – On base display, USAF History and Traditions Museum, Lackland AFB, Texas
60-0549 – Prairie Aviation Museum, in Bloomington, Illinois
60-0551 – To be displayed at the National Air and Space Museum in Washington, DC
60-0558 – American Legion Post 233 in Edinburgh, Indiana
60-0570 – Edward F. Beale Museum, Beale AFB, California
60-0573 - On display, Owatonna Degner Regional Airport, Owatonna, Minnesota (with 60-0589 and 61–0828)
60-0574 – On base display, Laughlin AFB, Texas
60-0589 - On display, Owatonna Degner Regional Airport, Owatonna, Minnesota (with 60-0573 and 61–0828)
61-0817 – Oklahoma Welcome Station, adjacent to Tinker AFB, Oklahoma.
61-0825 - On display, U.S. Space & Rocket Center, Huntsville, AL (as N999NA, not original paint scheme).  Appeared on Shipping Wars TV Show being transported to Huntsville, AL from NASA Houston.
61-0828 - On display, Owatonna Degner Regional Airport, Owatonna, Minnesota (with 60-0573 and 60–0589)
61-0829 - Gallup Municipal Airport, Gallup, New Mexico 
61-0838 – On base display, in front of Randolph Inn Visiting Officers Quarters (VOQ), Randolph AFB, Texas
61-0854 – Pima Air and Space Museum, adjacent to Davis-Monthan AFB in Tucson, Arizona, on display in the markings of the 479th Tactical Training Wing at Holloman AFB, NM, circa 1982.
61-0858 – Sheppard AFB Air Park, Sheppard AFB, Texas
61-0902 – Science Spectrum in Lubbock, Texas.
61-0926 - Salina Oklahoma, lawn of American Legion post #240 
62-3673 - Mason County Airport (Michigan) Construction Number (C/N)- N.5378, built 1962, painted blue and gray camouflage static displayed on a pedestal along US10 showing USAF tail markings of the 434th Fighter Training Squadron when it was located at Holloman Air Force Base between 1977 and 1991
63-8125 – Sheppard AFB Air Park, Sheppard AFB, Texas
63-8224 – Evergreen Aviation & Space Museum in McMinnville, Oregon; painted in NASA colors, suspended from the ceiling in the Air and Space Exhibit Hall.
64-13198 - Hangar 25 Museum, (former Webb AFB) in Big Spring, Texas
65-10405 – On base display, Columbus AFB, Mississippi
65-10426 – On base display, Vance AFB, Oklahoma
66-8381 / NASA 901 (N901NA) – Assigned directly to NASA as the second NASA T-38 to be designated as 'NASA 901' and 'N901NA'; on display at Aviation Heritage Park, Bowling Green, Kentucky

GT-38A
60-0592 – Dyess Linear Air Park, Dyess AFB, Texas
60-0593 – March Field Air Museum at March ARB (former March AFB) in Riverside, California, on display in Thunderbirds markings.
61-0824 – Hill Aerospace Museum adjacent to Hill AFB, Utah.

AT-38B
60-0576 – On base display, Holloman AFB, New Mexico.
65-10441 – National Museum of the United States Air Force at Wright-Patterson AFB in Dayton, Ohio. This aircraft was retired in 1991, came to the museum in 1999, and was placed on display in 2004.

T-38N
65-10329 / NASA 969 (N969NA) – On display at Kennedy Space Center Visitor Complex, NASA/John F. Kennedy Space Center, Merritt Island, Florida
65-10355 / NASA 913 (N913NA) – On display at the Intrepid Sea, Air & Space Museum, New York, New York
65-10402 / NASA 968 (N968NA) – On display at Space Center Houston  
66-8381 / NASA 901 (N901NA) – Assigned directly to NASA as the second NASA T-38 to be designated as NASA 901 and N901NA; on display at Aviation Heritage Park, Bowling Green, Kentucky

Specifications (T-38A)

See also

References

Notes

Bibliography

 Andrade, John U.S. Military Aircraft Designations and Serials since 1909 Midland Counties Publications, 1979, 
 Eden, Paul, ed. "Northrop F-5 family". Encyclopedia of Modern Military Aircraft. London: Amber Books, 2004.  
 Johnsen, Frederick A. Northrop F-5/F-20/T-38. North Branch, Minnesota: Specialty Press, 2006. 
 Shaw, Robbie. F-5: Warplane for the World. St. Paul, Minnesota: Motorbooks International, 1990.

External links

T-38 Talon page on GlobalSecurity.org
T-38 Talon page on SR-71.org
NASA photo gallery
"White Rocket," Air & Space/Smithsonian Magazine, Vol. 20, No. 3 (August/September 2005), pp. 58–65

T-038
1950s United States military trainer aircraft
Twinjets
Low-wing aircraft
Aircraft first flown in 1959